Alexander Baumjohann (born 23 January 1987) is a German footballer most recently played for Sydney FC as an attacking midfielder. After developing as a star junior with Schalke 04, he moved to Borussia Mönchengladbach and enjoyed great success with the Bundesliga club, earning a move to Bayern Munich in 2009.

A return to Schalke 04 soon followed, where he developed a reputation as an excellent provider, a reputation he further enhanced in spells with 1. FC Kaiserslautern and Hertha BSC. As of May 2018, he had amassed 46 career assists.

Baumjohann moved to Brazil so his wife, who is Brazilian, could be closer to her family. He signed a short-term contract with Coritiba in 2017 before moving to Vitória in 2018.

In 2009, he was twice selected for the Germany U21 team.

After joining the Western Sydney Wanderers in June 2018, he was hailed for his "magnificent" and "brilliant" performances by multiple observers, including manager Markus Babbel.

Career

Germany
Baumjohann began his youth career in 1991 with Teutonia Waltrop and in summer 2000, joined Schalke 04. After only two appearances in the first team he was signed by to Mönchengladbach in January 2007 on the promise of greater first team exposure. On 27 January 2007 he made his debut with Mönchengladbach against Energie Cottbus.

In July 2009, he moved to Bayern Munich on the recommendation of Jupp Heynckes, who personally scouted the player. Six months before the move, Heynckes foreshadowed a deal, saying that "Talent makes Alex a 'Bayern player', even though he has yet to make the breakthrough in the Bundesliga." However, after six months with Bayern and sporadic Bundesliga game time, he rejoined FC Schalke.

On 21 August 2012, Baumjohann joined 2. Bundesliga club Kaiserslautern on a one-year contract. In Baumjohann's 27th game for the club, he netted his sixth goal, scoring with a free-kick in a playoff vs. Hoffenheim for a place in the Bundesliga.

On 8 June 2013, it was announced that Baumjohann would leave Kaiserslautern, who lost to Hoffenheim in their Bundesliga play-off over two legs, for newly promoted Hertha BSC, signing a three-year contract with the capital club. On 18 March 2016, he extended his contract until 2017.

Brazil
After the 2016–17 season, Baumjohann considered playing in Brazil, the country of his wife. In July 2017, he signed with Coritiba. Having limited playing time at Coritiba due to a broken hand, Baumjohann left the club after its relegation, although wanting to renew his contract. In 2018, he joined Vitória.

Australia
On 9 August 2018, Baumjohann was brought to the A-League by coach Markus Babbel, signing with Western Sydney Wanderers. At the end of the season, the Wanderers released Baumjohann choosing not to renew his contract.

On 2 June 2019, Baumjohann signed a two-year deal with local rivals Sydney FC. Baumjohann enjoyed one of the best periods of his career, becoming a regular starter with the Sky Blues as they finished Champions in the 2019–20 A-League season and runner-up in the 2020-21 A-League season.

Two days after setting up the opening goal of the 2021 A-League Grand Final, Baumjohann announced that he would be departing the club.

Career statistics

Honours

Club
Schalke 04
 DFL-Ligapokal: 2005
 DFB-Pokal: 2010–11
 DFL-Supercup: 2011

Sydney FC
 A-League Championship: 2019–20
 A-League Premiership: 2019–20

Personal life
Baumjohann grew up in Waltrop, and attended the Gesamtschule Berger Feld.

In addition to his native German, Baumjohann can also speak Portuguese.

Baumjohann has a wife and two daughters.

References

External links
 
 

1987 births
Living people
German footballers
Borussia Mönchengladbach II players
Borussia Mönchengladbach players
Association football midfielders
FC Schalke 04 players
FC Schalke 04 II players
FC Bayern Munich footballers
FC Bayern Munich II players
1. FC Kaiserslautern players
Hertha BSC players
Western Sydney Wanderers FC players
Sydney FC players
Bundesliga players
2. Bundesliga players
3. Liga players
Germany youth international footballers
Germany under-21 international footballers
Coritiba Foot Ball Club players
Esporte Clube Vitória players
Campeonato Brasileiro Série A players
German expatriate footballers
German expatriate sportspeople in Brazil
Expatriate footballers in Brazil
People educated at the Gesamtschule Berger Feld